Radeberg is a small town in the district of Bautzen, Saxony, Germany. It is located approximately 20 kilometres north-east of Dresden. The town has an Evangelical and a Roman Catholic church, and an old castle.

History
Radeberg was mentioned for the first time in 1219, when farmers settled on the country to the large Roeder. The name of the place is probably derived from this river. In less than 150 years a market place, a castle and own units developed. In the year 1412 the municipal law was lent to the small market town.

500 years ago silver was found close of the town. The discovery site was thereupon renamed as Silver Hill. The mine was however quickly exhausted.

Industry
Its principal industries are the manufacture of glass, machinery, furniture and paper, and it produces a light lager "Radeberger Beer" which is largely exported. The company Robotron Elektronik Radeberg, formerly well known in East Germany for the production of portable television sets and powerful data processing equipment, was there. The Radeberger Brewery was founded in 1872, and is part of the Oetker Group. It brews Radeberger Pilsner, a 4.8% abv pale lager.

Transportation

The town is accessible by Radeberg railway station of Deutsche Bahn.

Notable people 
(Chronological order)
 Johannes Gelbke (1846–1903), German classical composer
 Theodor Arldt (1878–1960), German nature scientist, paleontologist, writer, teacher
 Georg Naumann (1901–1978), pioneering the exploration of northwest Canada / Alberta, esp. oil sands research
 Erhard Fischer (1922–1996), German music and theatre director
 Christian Leuckert (1930 - 2011), German botanist and lichenologist
 Hartmut Schade (born 1954), football player
 Thomas Scheibitz (born 1968), painter and sculptor

See also
 List of cities and towns in Germany

References

External links 

Official Web Site of Town Council
News In Town (english)

 
Populated places in Bautzen (district)